Ion Romică Ceaușu (born 13 October 1970) is a Romanian former footballer who played as a midfielder.

Honours
Argeș Pitești
Divizia B: 1993–94

Notes

References

1970 births
Living people
Romanian footballers
Association football midfielders
Romania under-21 international footballers
Liga I players
Liga II players
FC Argeș Pitești players
FCM Târgoviște players
ACF Gloria Bistrița players
Sportspeople from Pitești